Thomas Becker (born 13 January 1975 in Adelaide, South Australia), is an Australian baseball pitcher. He competed at the 2000 Summer Olympics.
He also played for the Adelaide Bites in the 2010-11 season.

References

1975 births
Adelaide Bite players
Olympic baseball players of Australia
Australian baseball players
Baseball players at the 1996 Summer Olympics
Living people
Sportspeople from Adelaide